The Duchy of Philippopolis was a short-lived duchy of the Latin Empire founded after the collapse and partition of the Byzantine Empire by the Fourth Crusade in 1204. It included the city of Philippopolis (modern Plovdiv) and the surrounding region.

History 
From 1204 to 1205, it was ruled by Renier of Trit. It was captured for a short time by Emperor Kaloyan of Bulgaria in 1207 but was lost by his successor Boril following his defeat at the Battle of Philippopolis in 1208. 

In ca. 1223/24, the then lord of Philippopolis, Gerard of Estreux (otherwise known as Gerard or Girard of Stroim, perhaps a form of Estrœung - Étrœungt - or Estreux) declared himself prepared to acknowledge the suzerainty of the Republic of Venice over a part of his possessions.

In the draft treaty concluded in December 1228 between John of Brienne and the regents of the Latin Empire, it was agreed that after his death, John's heirs would either take possession of the duchy (among other European territories) or of the Latin possessions in Asia Minor. However, in the treaty finally ratified in April 1229 (or 1230, according to Buchon), the rights of Gerard of Stroim over the duchy were confirmed. 

The territory of the duchy finally joined the Bulgarian Empire, in the aftermath of Tsar Ivan Asen II's victory over the Empire of Thessalonica at the Battle of Klokotnitsa in March 1230.

Dukes of Philippopolis 
 Renier of Trit (1204 – 1208)
  (1208 – 1229) 
 Jean de Brienne (1229 – 1237)

References

Sources 
 
 

 
States and territories established in 1204
States and territories disestablished in 1230